John V Palaiologos or Palaeologus (Iōánnēs Palaiológos; 18 June 1332 – 16 February 1391) was Byzantine emperor from 1341 to 1391, with interruptions.

Biography
John V was the son of Emperor Andronikos III and his wife Anna, the daughter of Count Amadeus V of Savoy by his wife Maria of Brabant. His long reign was marked by the gradual dissolution of imperial power amid numerous civil wars and the continuing ascendancy of the Ottoman Turks.

Early rule and first civil war
John V came to the throne at age eight. His reign began with an immediate civil war between his designated regent, his father's friend John VI Kantakouzenos, and a self-proclaimed council of regency composed of his mother Anna, the patriarch John XIV Kalekas, and the megas doux Alexios Apokaukos. During this civil war in 1343 Anna pawned the Byzantine crown jewels for 30,000 Venetian ducats. From 1346 to 1349, the Black Death devastated Constantinople.

Second civil war
Victorious in 1347, John VI Kantakouzenos ruled as co-emperor until his son Matthew Kantakouzenos was attacked by John V in 1352, leading to a second civil war. John V asked the ruler of Serbia, Stefan Dušan for help, and Dušan obliged by sending 4,000 Serbian horsemen to his aid. Matthew Kantakouzenos asked his father for help, and 10,000 Ottoman Turks showed up at Demotika (Didymoteicho) in October 1352 and engaged the forces of John V's Serbian allies in an open field battle that resulted in the destruction of the allies and a victory for the more numerous Turks in the service of the Byzantines. The Ottoman Empire thus acquired its first European territory, at Çimpe and Gallipoli. Able to retake Constantinople in 1354, John V removed and tonsured John VI Kantakouzenos; by 1357, he had deposed Matthew as well, who had been captured by the Serbs and was ransomed to John V.

Rule and defeats
In 1366, John V reached the Hungarian Kingdom, arriving at the Royal city of Buda to meet King Louis I of Hungary. However, the Byzantine emperor offended the king by staying on his horse, while Louis descended and approached him on foot. The Hungarian monarch then offered him help on the condition that John join the Catholic church, or at least achieve recognition by the Patriarch of the Pope's supremacy. The Emperor left the court of Buda with empty hands and continued his trip through Europe searching for assistance against the Ottomans.

The Ottomans, who had been allied with the Kantakouzenoi, continued to press John. Suleyman Paşa, the son of the Ottoman sultan, led their forces in Europe and was able to take Adrianople and Philippopolis and to exact tribute from the emperor. John V appealed to the West for help, proposing to Pope Urban V in 1367 to end the schism between the Byzantine and Latin churches by submitting the patriarchate to the supremacy of Rome. In October 1369, John, having travelled through Naples to Rome, formally converted to Catholicism in St Peter's Basilica and recognized the pope as supreme head of the Church.<ref>"...in the presence of four cardinals, he acknowledged, as a true Catholic, the supremacy of the pope, and the double procession of the Holy Ghost. After this purification, he was introduced to a public audience in the church of St. Peter: Urban, in the midst of the cardinals, was seated on his throne; the Greek monarch, after three genuflections, devoutly kissed the feet, the hands, and at length the mouth, of the holy father, who celebrated high mass in his presence, allowed him to lead the bridle of his mule, and treated him with a sumptuous banquet in the Vatican." – Edward Gibbon, The History of the Decline and Fall of the Roman Empire, Chapter 66 (Visit of John Palaeologus to Urban V. at Rome, A.D. 1369, 13 October etc.), via the Christian Classics Ethereal Library</ref> He was not accompanied by the clergy of the Byzantine Church and the move failed to bring about an end to the Schism.

Impoverished by war, he was detained as a debtor when he visited Venice in 1369 on his way back from Rome and was later captured on his way back through Bulgarian territories. In 1371, he recognized the suzerainty of the Ottoman sultan Murad I. Murad later assisted him against his son Andronikos when the latter deposed him in 1376.

Deposition and second rule

In 1390, his grandson John VII briefly usurped the throne, but was quickly overthrown. The same year, John V ordered the strengthening of the Golden Gate in Constantinople, utilizing marble from the decayed churches in and around the city. Upon completion of this construction, Bayezid I demanded that John raze these new works, threatening war and the blinding of his son Manuel, whom he held in captivity. John V carried out the Sultan's order but is said to have suffered from this humiliation and died soon thereafter on 16 February 1391, and was buried in the Hodegon Monastery in Constantinople.

John V was finally succeeded to the imperial throne by his son Manuel. His younger son Theodore had already acceded to the Despotate of Morea in 1383.

Family
John V married Helena Kantakouzene, daughter of his co-emperor John VI Kantakouzenos and Irene Asanina, on 28 May 1347. They had at least eleven children – five sons and at least six daughters. Their known children include:
 Andronikos IV Palaiologos (2 April 1348 – 28 June 1385);
 Irene Palaiologina (c. 1349 – after 1362), who married her first cousin Şehzade Halil, son of Orhan I and Helena's sister Theodora Kantakouzene. The couple had two sons, Şehzade Gunduz and Şehzade Omer.
 Manuel II Palaiologos (27 June 1350 – 21 July 1425);
 Theodore I Palaiologos, Lord of Morea (c. 1355 – 24 June 1407);
 Michael Palaiologos (d. 1376/1377), who claimed the throne of the Empire of Trebizond from Alexios III;
 Maria Palaiologina, married Murad I;
 One daughter betrothed to Peter II of Cyprus;
 An unnamed daughter reported to have entered a monastery in 1373;
 An unnamed daughters who married Bayezid I, son of Murad I;
 An unnamed daughters who married Yakub Çelebi, son of Murad I;
 Zampia Palaiologina, illegitimate daughter who married the official Hilario Doria

See also

List of Byzantine emperors

References

Ancestry

Sources
 Harris, Jonathan, The End of Byzantium. New Haven and London: Yale University Press, 2010. 
 Alexander Vasiliev, History of the Byzantine Empire 324–1453''. Madison: University of Wisconsin Press, 1952. 
 
 
 

John 05
Medieval child monarchs
1332 births
1391 deaths
Eastern Orthodox monarchs
Roman Catholic monarchs
Porphyrogennetoi
14th-century Byzantine emperors
Byzantine prisoners and detainees
Burials at the Monastery of Christ Pantocrator (Constantinople)
Byzantine people of the Byzantine–Ottoman wars
Converts to Roman Catholicism from Eastern Orthodoxy
Former Greek Orthodox Christians
Greek Eastern Catholics
Sons of Byzantine emperors